A god-slayer is one who kills gods.

God-slayer may also refer to:

 God Slayer, an action-adventure video game
 Godslayer, a 2006 fantasy novel
 Spawn: Godslayer, a comic book series
 "Godslayer", a song by White Zombie from Let Sleeping Corpses Lie